Hong Seok-jae (born 1983) is a South Korean film director and screenwriter. Hong wrote and directed his thriller feature debut Socialphobia (2015), which won the NETPAC Award and DGK Award for Best Director at the 19th Busan International Film Festival in 2014, and the Best New Director and Best New Actor (for Byun Yo-han) at the 24th Buil Film Awards in 2015. His short film Keep Quiet (2011) won the Special Jury Prize and I love Shorts! Audience Award at the Mise-en-scène Short Film Festival in 2012.

Filmography 
Grandma and Wrestling (short film, 2007) - editor 
8/10000 (short film, 2008) - assistant director
Election (short film, 2010) - director, screenwriter, editor
Keep Quiet (short film), 2011) - director, screenwriter, script editor
Heart Vibrator (short film, 2012) - actor
The Phishing (short film, 2012) - assistant director
LOVE FEE for last month (short film, 2012) - director, screenwriter
Ingtoogi: The Battle of Internet Trolls (2013) - actor
Socialphobia (2015) - director, screenwriter

Awards 
2014 19th Busan International Film Festival: DGK Award for Best Director (Socialphobia)
2015 24th Buil Film Awards: Best New Director (Socialphobia)
2016 3rd Wildflower Film Awards: Best New Director (Narrative Films) (Socialphobia)
2016 21st Chunsa Film Art Awards: Best New Director (Socialphobia)

References

External links 
 
 
 

1983 births
Living people
South Korean film directors
South Korean screenwriters
South Korean male film actors